William W. Parks (1921–2008) was an American competitive sailor and Olympic medalist.

He and Robert Halperin won a bronze medal for the United States in the Star class (mixed two-person keelboat) at the 1960 Summer Olympics in Rome. Their yacht was the Shrew II.

References

1921 births
2008 deaths
American male sailors (sport)
Chicago Yacht Club
Olympic bronze medalists for the United States in sailing
People from Illinois
Sailors at the 1960 Summer Olympics – Star
Medalists at the 1960 Summer Olympics